The 2012–13 season was Fleetwood Town's first in the Football League following promotion from the Football Conference the previous season.

League Two

Standings

Results summary

Squad

Statistics

|- 
|colspan="14"|Players currently out on loan:
|-

|-
|colspan="14"|Players who have left the club with appearances:

|}

Goalscorers

Disciplinary record

Transfers

In

Loans in

Out

Loans Out

Fixtures and Results

Pre–season

League Two

FA Cup

League Cup

League Trophy

References 

Fleetwood Town F.C. seasons
Fleetwood Town